One Health is an approach calling for "the collaborative efforts of multiple disciplines working locally, nationally, and globally, to attain optimal health for people, animals and our environment", as defined by the One Health Initiative Task Force (OHITF). It developed in response to evidence of the spreading of zoonotic diseases between species and increasing awareness of "the interdependence of human and animal health and ecological change". In this viewpoint, public health is no longer seen in purely human terms. Due to a shared environment and highly conserved physiology, animals and humans not only suffer from the same zoonotic diseases, but can also be treated by either structurally related or identical drugs. For this reason, special care must be taken to avoid unnecessary or over-treatment of zoonotic diseases, particularly in the context of drug resistance in infectious microbes.

A number of organizations throughout the world support the objectives of "One Health" including  the One Health Commission (OHC), One Health Initiative, One Health Platform, The FAO-OIE-WHO collaboration, CDC One Health Office and others.

History 
Calvin Schwabe, a veterinarian trained in public health, coined the term "One Medicine" in a veterinary medical textbook in 1964, to reflect the similarities between animal and human medicine and stress the importance of collaboration between veterinarians and physicians to help solve global health problems.  He established a department at University of California, Davis to jointly address issues in the animal and human health sciences.

In 2004, The Wildlife Conservation Society held a conference at Rockefeller University in New York called "One World, One Health". Out of that conference the twelve Manhattan Principles were created to describe a unified approach to the prevention of epidemic diseases. These principles emphasized links between humans, animals, and the environment; their importance in understanding disease dynamics; and the need for interdisciplinary approaches to prevention, education, investment, and policy development.

Due to global scares surrounding the H5N1 influenza outbreaks of the early-mid 2000s, the American Veterinary Medical Association established a One Health Initiative Task Force in 2006, the  American Medical Association passed a One Health resolution to promote partnering between veterinary and human medical organizations in 2007, and a One Health approach was recommended for responses to global disease outbreaks in 2007. Building on these initiatives, the Food and Agriculture Organization (FAO), World Organization for Animal Health (OIE), and World Health Organization (WHO) came together with the United Nations Children's Fund (UNICEF), United Nations System Influenza Coordination, and the World Bank to develop a framework entitled "Contributing to One World, One Health-A Strategic Framework for Reducing Risks of Infectious Diseases at the Animal-Human-Ecosystems Interface” in 2008, reiterating recommendations for a One Health approach to global health. This framework was expanded and implementable policies developed at Stone Mountain, Georgia in May 2010.  International meetings with the topic of One Health were held in 2011 in Africa and Australia.

In 2012, Barbara Natterson-Horowitz, a physician, and Kathryn Bowers, a science journalist, published the book Zoobiquity, coining the term as they drew parallels between animal and human health through vivid case studies.  They called for the biomedical scientific and clinical communities to rediscover comparative medicine and reexamine human and animal health in terms of evolution and the environment. A New York Times bestseller, the book has been described as "easy to read and entertaining" in its presentation of ideas similar to the "One Health" concept, but also criticized as lacking depth and failing to recognize the extent to which animals and humans have differently evolved as complex systems.

In 2016, The One Health Commission, One Health Platform, and One Health Initiative Team deemed International One Health Day to be November 3.

In 2019, Senator Tina Smith and Representative Kurt Schrader introduced the Advancing Emergency Preparedness Through One Health Act into the United States Senate and House of Representatives, respectively. This bi-partisan piece of legislation would require that the Department of Health and Human Services, Department of Agriculture, and other federal agencies develop a coordinated plan to create a One Health Framework to help prepare responses to zoonotic disease and prevent disease outbreaks.
The bill was re-introduced by Tina Smith and Todd Young as of March 18, 2021.

Leading organizations

One Health Commission (OHC) 
In 2007, Roger K. Mahr from the American Veterinary Medical Association, Jay H. Glasser from the American Public Health Association, and Ronald M. Davis from the American Medical Association came together as liaisons with other health science professionals, academics, students, government workers, and industry scientists to create a task force and have teleconferences to discuss One Health. This One Health Initiative Task Force created a report in 2008 which outlined recommendations to create a joint steering committee, implement improved communications efforts, plan national One Health studies, develop a One Health Commission, create advisory teams, establish national meetings, and engage medical, veterinary, and public health students.

The One Health Commission (OHC) was chartered in Washington, D.C. in 2009 as a 501(c)3 non-profit organization.  Its mission is to connect individuals and create relationships across human, animal, and environmental health sectors, as well as to educate the public about these issues with the intent to improve global health. Roger Mahr was the founding CEO. A request for proposal for an institutional partner was put forth in 2010, and Iowa State University was selected to be the main site for operations. In 2013, Roger Mahr retired from the commission and the operations site moved to the Research Triangle of North Carolina, where it currently resides. The current executive director is Cheryl Stroud, a veterinarian, who has held the position since 2013.

The One Health Commission began in 2014 compiling a Who's Who in One Health, a Directory of organizations around the world that are actively working to further the One Health paradigm shift. The OHC also oversees a Global One Health Community listserv. In addition the commission has a webpage known as the One Health Library with many types of resources available on the topic of or connected to One Health.

One Health Initiative 
The One Health Initiative is an interdisciplinary movement to create collaborations between animal, human, and environmental health organizations including the American Veterinary Medical Association, American Medical Association, Centers for Disease Control and Prevention, United States Department of Agriculture, Vétérinaires sans Frontières/ Tierärzte ohne Grenzen and the United States National Environmental Health Association, among others. Such collaboration, which often remains very limited, could lead to more quick and profound exchange of knowledge and insights between disciplines and professionals, which is important to better and more rapidly respond to outbreaks and newly emerging zoonoses and diseases.

One Health Platform 
The One Health Platform is a scientific reference network to unite researchers and experts to better understand and prepare for zoonotic disease outbreaks from animals to humans, and antimicrobial resistance, including a better understanding of environmental factors that impact disease dynamics.
The management board is made up of Ab Osterhaus, John Mackenzie and Chris Vanlangendonck.

The organization has nine objectives, which include disseminating research results at biennial meetings, identifying knowledge gaps in the field, engaging policy makers, establishing a Bio Threats Scanning Group to connect One Health and global health security, share data, serve as a reference network to the government, foster collaborations, and implement  policies, and increase awareness during One Health Day.

The One Health Platform was responsible for organizing the World One Health Congress meeting each year 2015 - 2020.
The next World One Health Congress scheduled for 2022 continued in Singapore hosted by SingHealth Duke-NUS Global Health Institute.

The FAO-OIE-WHO Collaboration 
The  Food and Agriculture Organization of the United Nations (FAO)  works closely with the OIE and WHO, referred to all together as the Tripartite organizations.

The World Health Organization (WHO) was a partner in the 2008 establishment of a strategic One Health framework for approaching global health problems. In September 2017, a feature page for One Health was included on the WHO website, defining One Health and highlighting important topic areas such as food safety, zoonotic disease, and antimicrobial resistance.

The World Organization for Animal Health (OIE) headquartered in Paris, France. was also a partner in establishing a strategic One Health framework in 2008. The OIE works to maintain transparency surrounding global animal disease, collect and distribute veterinary information, publish international trade standards for animals/ animal products, improve veterinary services globally, and to promote animal welfare and food safety.

The Food and Agriculture Organization of the United Nations (FAO) put forth in 2011 a strategic action plan for One Health, which had the objective to strengthen food security by improving animal production systems and veterinary services and called for action in improving collaborations between animal, human, and environmental health sectors. 
The FAO,    OIE and WHO published a new guide to approaching zoonotic disease with a One Health framework in 2019.

CDC One Health Office 
The Centers for Disease Control and Prevention (CDC),   created a One Health Office in 2009, becoming the first United States federal agency to have an office dedicated to this field. This office works alongside other animal, human, and environmental health organizations both within the United States and across the world in order to increase the awareness of One Health and develop tools to help strengthen One Health movements.  The CDC One Health Office is involved with multiple initiatives, including working to implement a Zoonotic Disease Prioritization process, creating Global Health Security Agenda Action Packages, overseeing the Zoonoses Education Coalition, developing guidelines with the National Association of State Public Health Veterinarians, and helping educate youth involved with agriculture about influenza.  Additionally, the CDC One Health Office hosts webinars to educate audiences about One Health issues such as food safety, antimicrobial resistance, and recent disease outbreaks.

The One Health Zoonotic Disease Prioritization process is led by the CDC, holding workshops internationally to prioritize which zoonotic diseases are of the most concern and helping countries develop action plans to address those diseases. The process involves 3-6 neutral facilitators representing human, animal, and environmental health sectors, up to 12 voting members which represent human health/public health, agriculture/livestock, wildlife/fisheries, the environment and other relevant government sectors, and 10-15 advisors from international organizations such as the CDC, WHO, FAO or OIE, academic partners, NGOs or other government sectors not directly involved in zoonotic diseases. The CDC One Health Office trains facilitators and it takes months to prepare for a workshop to acquire resources, identify participants, review zoonotic diseases and confirm logistics. Completed workshops have been held in a variety of countries including Pakistan, Tanzania, Thailand, Uzbekistan, China, and the United States with more workshops upcoming.  Diseases most commonly prioritized worldwide include rabies, brucellosis, influenza, Ebola virus, and Rift Valley fever.

Recommend for future actions 
To ensure fair and community-oriented investment in One Health initiatives that involve multiple institutional and international partners, it is crucial to strengthen their governance foundations. The global One Health community can learn three important lessons to make One Health more inclusive. Firstly, One Health Networks should promote collaboration and cooperation among stakeholders through appropriate governance arrangements and management strategies, as demonstrated by GARC and DANMAP. Secondly, power should be balanced and calibrated to ensure that country leadership and ownership of activities are prioritized. Investment in One Health Networks should be based on local needs and priorities, rather than donor priorities. Lastly, community stakeholders should be included in partnership structures and governance arrangements of One Health Networks to engage meaningfully with local realities and establish action priorities.

See also
 Conservation medicine
 EcoHealth
 Environmental health
 Planetary health

References

Further reading
 
  

Zoonoses
Health policy
Veterinary medicine